The mimetic theory of desire, an explanation of human behavior and culture, originated with the French historian, literary critic, and  philosopher of social science René Girard (1923-2015). The name of the theory derives from the philosophical concept mimesis, which carries a wide range of meanings. In mimetic theory, mimesis refers to human desire, which Girard thought was not linear but the product of a mimetic process in which people  imitate models who endow objects with value. Girard called this phenomenon "mimetic desire", and described mimetic desire as the foundation of his theory:

"Man is the creature who does not know what to desire, and he turns to others in order to make up his mind. We desire what others desire because we imitate their desires."

Mimetic theory posits that mimetic desire leads to natural rivalry and eventually to scapegoating - Girard called this the scapegoat mechanism. In his study of history, Girard formed the hypothesis that societies unify their imitative desires around the destruction of a collectively agreed-upon scapegoat.

References

Bibliography 
 René Girard. I See Satan Fall Like Lightning. New York, NY: Orbis Books, 2001.
 René Girard. and Benoît Chantre. Battling to the End: Conversations with Benoît Chantre. East Lansing, MI: Michigan State University Press, 2009.
 René Girard. Evolution and Conversion Dialogues on the Origins of Culture. London: Bloomsbury Publishing PLC, 2017.

External links
Colloquium on Violence & Religion: international organization of scholars and practitioners interested in mimetic theory

Persecution
Competition
Concepts in aesthetics